Ramsey Nouah (born Ramsey Tokunbo Nouah Jr.; 19 December 1970) is a Nigerian actor and director. He won the Africa Movie Academy Award for Best Actor in a Leading Role in 2010 for his performance in the movie The Figurine. He made his directorial debut with the film Living in Bondage: Breaking Free in 2019 and also went on to direct Nollywood classic Rattle Snake: The Ahanna Story which is a remake of Rattlesnake (1995).

Early life
Ramsey Tokunbo Nouah Jr. was born in Lagos on December 19, 1970, to an Israeli Jewish father and a Yoruba mother who hails from Owo, Ondo State. He grew up in Surulere, Lagos, where he attended Atara Primary School and Community Grammar School. He received a diploma in Mass Communications at the University of Lagos, after which he pursued a career in acting.

Career
Ramsey Nouah started acting in the early 1990s because he needed money for his General Certificate Education (GCE). His acting career kicked off when he starred as Jeff Akin-Thomas in the Nigerian TV soap opera Fortunes. He has since appeared in numerous films starring as the lead role, and has been called "Lover-Boy" for his numerous roles in romantic films. He is also considered to be one of the most sought-after actors in Nigeria.

In 2015, Nouah secured the rights to the 1992 movie Living in Bondage  for a possible remake.  In 2018, he announced his remake had become a sequel titled Living in Bondage: Breaking Free, which was released on November 8, 2019. Nouah, who played the new villain, made his directorial debut, and the film  won 7 awards at the Africa Magic Viewers Choice Awards.

Awards

Personal life
Nouah is married to Emelia Philips-Nouah. The couple have two sons named Quincy Nouah and Joshua Nouah, and one daughter named Desiree Nouah.

Selected filmography

Film

Television

References

External links
 
 

Best Actor Africa Movie Academy Award winners
Living people
1970 births
Nigerian people of Israeli descent
Yoruba male actors
20th-century Nigerian male actors
21st-century Nigerian male actors
Male actors in Yoruba cinema
University of Lagos alumni
Male actors from Lagos
Nigerian male film actors
Nigerian male television actors
Male actors from Ondo State
21st-century Nigerian actors
Nigerian film directors
Nigerian entertainment industry businesspeople